The Singing Senators were a group of U.S. Republican senators who sang as a barbershop quartet.

Members 
Representation as of 2000:

 Fmr. Sen. John Ashcroft (R-Missouri) – Baritone
 Fmr. Sen. Larry Craig (R-Idaho) – Lead
 Fmr. Sen. Jim Jeffords (R-Vermont 1989–2001) (I-Vermont 2001–2007) – Tenor
 Fmr. Sen. Trent Lott (R-Mississippi) – Bass

History

Beginnings 
In 1995, at New Hampshire Senator Bob Smith's birthday party, Ashcroft, Jeffords, Lott, and Connie Mack of Florida sang "Happy Birthday". Later, when Senator Bob Packwood of Oregon was having a birthday party, Jeffords called Lott and suggested that the four of them sing at the party. Mack declined, but Larry Craig joined. According to his autobiography, Herding Cats, A Life in Politics, Lott formed the group in large part to improve relations between the Republican Conference, of which Lott was Majority Leader, and Jeffords, a Republican who frequently voted with the Democrats.

During the initial years, the four senators usually practiced in Lott's hideaway office.  Guy Hovis, the Mississippi state director for Lott, was a talented musician who gave the senators some training. They all practiced together every day.

1995–2000 
Their first official performance of the group was in October 1995 for the American Council of Young Political Leaders (ACYPL), in which they sang "Elvira" at a fundraising event at the Kennedy Center organized by Ray Ivey of Consolidated Natural Gas. In December 1995, the group appeared on The Today Show.

In April 1996, the Oak Ridge Boys sang with the group at a Senate reception, something described in The Hill, a Capitol Hill newspaper, as "Congressional Harmony". In September 1996 the group performed again with the Oak Ridge Boys in Branson, Missouri. The same year, the senators sang at the 1996 Republican National Convention.

In 1998 the group released their only album, Let Freedom Sing, a ten-song CD recorded in Nashville. In 2000, clips of the group's songs could be streamed from the Senate pages of Ashcroft and Jeffords.

In November 2000, Ashcroft lost his Senate re-election race (he was appointed Attorney General in early 2001).  In May 2001, Jeffords announced he was leaving the Republican Party to become an Independent, returning control of the Senate to the Democrats.  The two events, combined, led to the apparent demise of the group.

Revival 
In October 2006, Singing Senators Lott and Craig said they were putting the quartet back together after a six-year hiatus. They said they had found two solid prospects in Senators Bob Bennett (R-Utah) and John Thune (R-S.D.)

In June 2007, Singing Senators Ashcroft, Craig, and Lott gave their first public performance in more than six years. Senator Craig was subsequently inducted into the Idaho Hall of Fame, having been selected in March 2007. Craig said that the group was now a trio. Lott's announced resignation in 2007 seemed to put the existence of even a trio in doubt. Craig's decision to not run for another term in 2008—due in part to the controversy over his arrest for solicitation the previous year—spelled the formal end of the group.

Other singing legislators
 Orrin Hatch (R-Utah), a member of the Church of Jesus Christ of Latter-day Saints, was also a religious music artist. In 2002, personal income from his recordings peaked at $18,009, according to a Senate financial disclosure.
 The Second Amendments, made up of five congressmen from the House of Representatives.
 MP4, who are a British rock group comprising four UK politicians (three serving members of parliament and one former member of parliament).

References 

Musical groups established in 1995
Musical groups disestablished in 2007
A cappella musical groups
American vocal groups
Musical groups from Washington, D.C.
Republican Party United States senators
Music and politics